京 is the Han character meaning "capital (city)," and the simplified form of the older way of writing the character, 亰. The character is predominantly used in the names of current and former capital cities within the East Asian cultural sphere.

Current city names
 Beijing, People's Republic of China (北京, "northern capital")
 Nanjing, People's Republic of China (南京, "southern capital")
 Tokyo, Japan (東京, "eastern capital")
 Kyoto, Japan (京都, "capital city")

Former city names
 Gyeongseong (京城, "capital city") one of the former names of Seoul during Japan's occupation of Korea
 Shèngjīng (盛京, "rising capital") one of the former names of Shenyang as the Manchu capital
 Hsinking (新京, "new capital") former name of Changchun as the capital of Japanese puppet state Manchukuo
 Gaegyeong (開京, "open capital") or Kaesong (開城, "capital castle"), two of the former names of Kaesong
 Đông Kinh (東京, "eastern capital"), one of the former names of Hanoi; see Tonkin

Other uses
 京 (Kyo (musician)), a Japanese musician known as the vocalist of Dir En Grey
 The Chinese number 京 jīng and the Japanese number 京 kei, both meaning ten quadrillion (10,000,000,000,000,000)

See also
Kyo (disambiguation)
, for the relation of the character 京 to the crest design